North Avenue station may refer to:
North Avenue station (Baltimore Light Rail), a train station in Baltimore, Maryland
Penn-North station, a subway station in Baltimore, Maryland which was referred to as North Avenue station during its planning and construction
North Avenue station (MARTA), a MARTA train station in Atlanta, Georgia
North Avenue Grand Central station, an under-construction train station in Quezon City, Philippines
North Avenue station (MRT), a train station in Quezon City, Philippines

See also
 North Station (disambiguation)